Fábio Igor Ribeiro Marques (born 25 December 1990) is a Portuguese retired footballer who played as a defender.

Career
Born in Vila Nova de Famalicão, Braga District, Marques spent his entire youth career with C.F. Os Belenenses, apart from two years in the ranks of Atlético Madrid in Spain. He was an unused substitute in two matches in the second half of the 2009–10 season in which the Lisbon team were relegated from the Primeira Liga, and made his only professional league appearance on 22 August that year by playing the full 90 minutes of a 1–1 home draw with F.C. Arouca.

Marques spent the rest of his career in the third tier with C.D. Pinhalnovense (loan), Clube Oriental de Lisboa, G.S. Loures, G.D. Vitória de Sernache and Clube Operário Desportivo. He made a return in the 2020/21 Season with Associação Desportiva de Oeiras, playing as a striker, scoring 5 goals in 12 goals, which made him a key figure in the team that won promotion to the 1st Division of the Lisbon Regional Championships. He remained at the club and returned to his original centre back position, continuing to pose as a main figure of the squad.

External links 

1990 births
Living people
People from Vila Nova de Famalicão
Portuguese footballers
Association football defenders
C.F. Os Belenenses players
C.D. Pinhalnovense players
Clube Oriental de Lisboa players
GS Loures players
G.D. Vitória de Sernache players
Liga Portugal 2 players
Segunda Divisão players
Sportspeople from Braga District